Keith Hanlon (born 1 September 1966) is an Irish archer. He competed in the men's individual event at the 1996 Summer Olympics.

References

External links
 

1966 births
Living people
Irish male archers
Olympic archers of Ireland
Archers at the 1996 Summer Olympics
Place of birth missing (living people)